Michael Farenas (born June 10, 1984 in Sorsogon, Philippines), is a Filipino professional boxer.

Born in Sorsogon, Farenas currently resides in Redondo Beach, California, California. He is a protégé of former world two division champion Gerry Penalosa.

Fighting style
A hard hitting southpaw, Farenas is known for his aggressive style and his powerful punches.

Professional career

Featherweight
Farenas made his professional debut on September 19, 2004 against Octavio Olinar at the Sports and Cultural Complex in Mandaue, Philippines. The bout ended in a technical draw after 2 rounds.

On March 15, 2008, Farenas challenged Mexican boxer Baudel Cardenas in the undercard of the Manny Pacquiao-Juan Manuel Marquez big fight at the Mandalay Bay Resort and Casino in Paradise, Nevada. The Filipino prospect won the bout by a third-round technical knockout. After knocking down Cardenas twice in the 2nd round, Farenas landed a vicious low blow in round 3. The Mexican was given five minutes to recover, but he could not continue, forcing the referee to stop the match.

In his next fight, Farenas moved to the super-featherweight division to face Fermin delos Santos. The two fought on May 17, 2008 at the Plaza Monumental in Aguascalientes, Mexico. The Filipino boxer defeated his foe via unanimous decision after 8 rounds. For the fight, the protégé of former WBO bantamweight champion Gerry Peñalosa trained under the guidance of Freddie Roach.

First title
Farenas won the World Professional Boxing Federation featherweight title on October 3, 2009 by stopping South Korean fighter Jae-Bong Jang in 9 rounds.

On March 13, 2010, Farenas was included in the undercard of the Manny Pacquiao-Joshua Clottey bout. He took on American boxer Joe Morales. The bout ended in a no contest after 2 round, because of an accidental clash of heads that opened a bad cut over Morales' right eye. This forced the ringside doctor to stop the bout.

Super Featherweight
In his next bout, Farenas challenged Marlon "Rata" Aguilar of Nicaragua in the undercard of the Latin Fury 14 pay-per-view, which showcased the return of Antonio Margarito against Roberto Garcia in Aguascalientes, Mexico. The fight took place on May 8, 2010. Farenas lost by an eight-round unanimous decision and practically blew away his chance at a possible world title bout.

Fareñas had difficulty handling Aguilar who had the edge during infighting sequences. The Filipino boxer tried to be more aggressive in the third but his momentum was hindered when he landed a low blow. In the 6th round, the referee deducted a point from Farenas for low blows and then again in round eight. The latter was falling way behind on points and needed a knockout to win but he didn't seem to have the energy or the inclination to try to get it done. Another low blow from the Filipino fighter interrupted the last round action.

Farenas went on to win 7 straight fights after the Aguilar fight and a draw against Takashi Uchiyama for the WBA title. He then landed an undercard fight on the Pacquiao-Marquez 4 event on December 8, 2012. He fought highly regarded Yuriorkis Gamboa in a 12-round battle for the interim WBA strap. Farenas was knocked down twice but rallied to deliver a knockdown of his own in the 9th round. However, Farenas lost via unanimous decision.

On April 27, 2013, Farenas fought an outmatched Gerardo Zayas whose record was 19-21-2. Farenas dropped Zayas three times in the first round en route to a TKO win against the journeyman.

Professional Boxing Record

|-
| style="text-align:center;" colspan="8"|42 Wins (34 knockouts), 5 Losses (0 knockouts), 4 Draws, 1 No Contest
|-  style="text-align:center; background:#e3e3e3;"
|  style="border-style:none none solid solid; "|Res.
|  style="border-style:none none solid solid; "|Record
|  style="border-style:none none solid solid; "|Opponent
|  style="border-style:none none solid solid; "|Type
|  style="border-style:none none solid solid; "|Round
|  style="border-style:none none solid solid; "|Date
|  style="border-style:none none solid solid; "|Location
|  style="border-style:none none solid solid; "|Notes
|- align=center
|Win
|41-5-4
|align=left| Martin Angel Martinez
|KO || 3  || 2017-6-1
|align=left| The Hangar, Costa Mesa , United States
|align=left|
|- align=center
|Win
|41-5-4
|align=left| Vachayan Khamon
|KO || 3  || 2015-10-31
|align=left| Elorde Sports Center, Parañaque, Metro Manila, Philippines
|align=left|
|- align=center
|Win
|40-5-4
|align=left| Boonsom Phothong
|TKO || 2  || 2015-04-25
|align=left| The Flash Grand Ballroom of the Elorde Sports Complex, Parañaque, Metro Manila, Philippines
|align=left|
|- align=center
|Loss
|39-5-4
|align=left| José Pedraza
|UD || 12  || 2014-11-1
|align=left| Coliseo Roberto Clemente, San Juan, Puerto Rico
|align=left|
|- align=center
|Win
|39-4-4
|align=left| Mark Davis
|TKO || 8  || 2014-07-02
|align=left| Foxwoods Resort, Mashantucket, Connecticut, United States
|align=left|
|- align=center
|Win
|38-4-4
|align=left| Héctor Velázquez
|TKO || 2  || 2014-03-21
|align=left| San Juan Arena, San Juan, Metro Manila, Philippines
|align=left|
|- align=center
|Win
|37-4-4
|align=left| Jesus Rios
|TKO || 2  || 2013-12-13
|align=left| Solaire Resort Hotel and Casino, Pasay, Metro Manila, Philippines
|align=left|
|- align=center
|Win
|36-4-4
|align=left| Kosol Sor Vorapin
|KO || 2  || 2013-10-26
|align=left| Makati Coliseum, Makati, Metro Manila, Philippines
|align=left|
|- align=center
|Win
|35-4-4
|align=left| Gerardo Zayas
|TKO || 1  || 2013-04-27
|align=left| Erwin Center, Austin, Texas, United States
|align=left|
|- align=center
|Loss
|34-4-4
|align=left| Yuriorkis Gamboa
|UD || 12  || 2012-12-08
|align=left| MGM Grand, Grand Garden Arena, Las Vegas, Nevada, United States
|align=left|
|- align=center
|style="background: #dae2f1"|Draw
|34-3-4
|align=left| Takashi Uchiyama
|TD || 3  || 2012-07-16
|align=left|Winghat, Kasukabe, Saitama, Japan
|align=left|
|- align=center
|Win
|34-3-3
|align=left| Jason Mitsuyama
|SD || 10  || 2012-04-21
|align=left| Mandaue, Philippines
|align=left|
|- align=center
|Win
|33-3-3
|align=left| Kenichi Yamaguchi
|UD || 12  || 2011-10-01
|align=left| Hoops Dome, Lapu-Lapu, Philippines
|align=left|
|- align=center
|Win
|32-3-3
|align=left| Fernando Beltran
|SD || 8  || 2011-07-16
|align=left| Blaisdell Center, Honolulu, Hawaii, United States
|align=left|
|- align=center
|Win
|31-3-3
|align=left| Daniel Attah
|UD || 12  || 2011-05-21
|align=left| Morongo Casino Resort & Spa, Cabazon, California, United States
|align=left|
|-align=center
|Win
|30-3-3
|align=left| Ariel Delgado
|MD || 10  || 2011-01-14
|align=left| Parañaque, Metro Manila, Philippines
|align=left|
|-align=center
|Win
|29-3-3
|align=left| Sangpetch Patanakan Gym
|TKO || 1  || 2010-10-10
|align=left|  Zamboanga City, Philippines
|align=left|
|-align=center
|Win
|28-3-3
|align=left| Simson Butar Butar
|KO || 2  || 2010-07-23
|align=left|  Mandaluyong, Metro Manila, Philippines
|align=left|
|-align=center
|Loss
|27-3-3
|align=left| Marlon Aguilar
|UD || 8  || 2010-05-08
|align=left| La Feria de San Marcos, Aguascalientes, Mexico
|align=left|
|-align=center
|style="background: #DDDDDD"|NC
|27-2-3
|align=left| Joe Morales
|NC || 2  || 2010-03-13
|align=left| Cowboys Stadium, Arlington, Texas, United States
|align=left|
|-align=center
|Win
|27-2-3
|align=left| Sathian Somkhao
|KO || 1  || 2010-01-08
|align=left| Mandaluyong, Metro Manila, Philippines
|align=left|
|-align=center
|Win
|26-2-3
|align=left| Jae-Bong Jang
|TKO || 9  || 2009-10-03
|align=left| Cuneta Astrodome, Pasay, Metro Manila, Philippines
|align=left|
|-align=center
|style="background: #dae2f1"|Draw
|25-2-3
|align=left| Arturo Gomez
|TD || 2  || 2007-09-14
|align=left| Palenque del Recinto Ferial, Nuevo Vallarta, Nayarit, Mexico
|align=left|
|-align=center
|Win
|25-2-2
|align=left| Walter Estrada
|KO || 1  || 2009-05-01
|align=left| Hard Rock Hotel and Casino, Las Vegas, Nevada, United States
|align=left|
|-align=center
|Win
|24-2-2
|align=left| Sunan Thosen
|KO || 3   || 2008-12-27
|align=left| Mandaluyong, Metro Manila, Philippines
|align=left|
|-align=center
|Win
|23-2-2
|align=left| Sorachet Tongmala
|KO || 1  || 2008-10-11
|align=left| Mandaluyong, Metro Manila, Philippines
|align=left|
|-align=center
|Win
|22-2-2
|align=left| Boonmee Sithsrivinitwitthayakom
|KO || 6  || 2008-07-30
|align=left| Liloan, Cebu, Philippines
|align=left|
|-align=center
|Win
|21-2-2
|align=left| Fermin De los Santos
|UD || 8  || 2008-05-17
|align=left| Plaza Monumental, Aguascalientes, Mexico
|align=left|
|-align=center
|Win
|20-2-2
|align=left| Baudel Cardenas
|TKO || 3  || 2008-03-15
|align=left| Mandalay Bay Resort & Casino, Las Vegas, Nevada, United States
|align=left|
|-align=center
|Win
|19-2-2
|align=left| Kongsurin Sithsoei
|KO || 5  || 2007-12-26
|align=left| Agoncillo, Batangas, Philippines
|align=left|
|-align=center
|Win
|18-2-2
|align=left| Arturo Valenzuela
|TKO || 2  || 2007-10-06
|align=left| Mandalay Bay Hotel & Casino, Mandalay Bay Events Center, Las Vegas, Nevada, United States
|align=left|
|-align=center
|Win
|17-2-2
|align=left| Jesar Ancajas
|KO || 4  || 2007-08-04
|align=left| General Santos, Philippines
|align=left|
|-align=center
|Win
|16-2-2
|align=left| Jeffrey Onate
|TKO || 2  || 2007-04-29
|align=left| Manila, Metro Manila, Philippines
|align=left|
|-align=center
|Win
|15-2-2
|align=left| Dondon Lapuz
|RTD || 2  || 2007-03-03
|align=left| Parañaque, Metro Manila, Philippines
|align=left|
|-align=center
|Win
|14-2-2
|align=left| Takuro Matsubara
|UD || 4  || 2007-01-13
|align=left| Korakuen Hall, Tokyo, Japan
|align=left|
|-align=center
|Win
|13-2-2
|align=left| Ronald Postrano
|TKO || 2  || 2006-11-18
|align=left| Pasay, Metro Manila, Philippines
|align=left|
|-align=center
|Win
|12-2-2
|align=left| Julius Tarona
|TKO || 7  || 2006-09-17
|align=left| Taguig, Metro Manila, Philippines
|align=left|
|-align=center
|style="background: #dae2f1"|Draw
|11-2-2
|align=left| Roel Mangan
|SD || 10  || 2006-07-22
|align=left| Binangonan, Rizal, Philippines
|align=left|
|-align=center
|Win
|11-2-1
|align=left| Jerome Arsolon
|TKO || 5  || 2006-06-09
|align=left| Bacoor, Cavite, Philippines
|align=left|
|-align=center
|Win
|10-2-1
|align=left| Jaime Barcelona
|TD || 6  || 2006-04-21
|align=left| Manila, Metro Manila, Philippines
|align=left|
|-align=center
|Win
|9-2-1
|align=left| Edwen Gastador
|TKO || 3  || 2006-03-12
|align=left| Cawayan, Masbate, Philippines
|align=left|
|-align=center
|Loss
|8-2-1
|align=left| Aaron Melgarejo
|SD || 10  || 2006-01-21
|align=left| Binangonan, Rizal, Philippines
|align=left|
|-align=center
|Win
|8-1-1
|align=left| Roberto Moreno
|KO || 2  || 2005-12-10
|align=left| Antipolo, Philippines
|align=left|
|-align=center
|Win
|7-1-1
|align=left| Dondon Lapuz
|TKO || 4  || 2005-11-08
|align=left| Taguig, Metro Manila, Philippines
|align=left|
|-align=center
|Loss
|6-1-1
|align=left| Jun Paderna
|UD || 10  || 2005-08-20
|align=left| Binangonan, Rizal, Philippines
|align=left|
|-align=center
|Win
|6-0-1
|align=left| Melvin Ayudtud
|KO || 1  || 2005-07-16
|align=left| San Carlos, Negros Occidental, Philippines
|align=left|
|-align=center
|Win
|5-0-1
|align=left| Greggy Tao on
|TKO || 2  || 2005-05-06
|align=left| Manila, Metro Manila, Philippines
|align=left|
|-align=center
|Win
|4-0-1
|align=left| Presciano Tabasa
|TKO || 1  || 2005-04-09
|align=left| Angono, Rizal, Philippines
|align=left|
|-align=center
|Win
|3-0-1
|align=left| Marlon Galicia
|TKO || 2  || 2005-03-05
|align=left| Taguig, Metro Manila, Philippines
|align=left|
|-align=center
|Win
|2-0-1
|align=left| Ferdinand Sagado
|KO || 4  || 2004-11-27
|align=left| Parañaque, Metro Manila, Philippines
|align=left|
|-align=center
|Win
|1-0-1
|align=left| Just Bornilla
|KO || 4  || 2004-10-21
|align=left| Taguig, Metro Manila, Philippines
|align=left|
|-align=center
|style="background: #dae2f1"|Draw
|0-0-1
|align=left| Octavio Aleonar
|TD || 2  || 2004-09-19
|align=left| Mandaue, Philippines
|align=left|Pro Debut
|-align=center

References

External links

1984 births
Living people
Featherweight boxers
Southpaw boxers
Sportspeople from Sorsogon
Filipino male boxers